Dark Purpose is a 1964 film directed by George Marshall and starring Shirley Jones, Rossano Brazzi, and George Sanders.

Plot
American secretary Karen Williams travels to Italy with her employer, art appraiser Raymond Fountaine, to assess the valuable collection of Count Paolo Barbarelli at his villa overlooking the sea.

The count lives there with Cora, a young woman suffering from memory loss, whom he claims to have taken in like a daughter after her skiing accident. Karen falls in love with the count, but Cora wants her gone. She later confides to Karen that she is not Paolo's daughter but his wife. He is slowly poisoning her so he ultimately can inherit her family's money, Cora says, but Karen isn't sure whether to believe her story.

Cora is found dead. The police believe it to be a suicide, but evidence at the scene leads Karen to believe that Paolo was indeed responsible for the young woman's death. It leads to a confrontation and violent struggle. A vicious watchdog tries to protect his master, but instead knocks Paolo into a fountain, where he drowns.

Cast
 Shirley Jones as Karen Williams 
 Rossano Brazzi as Count Paolo Barbarelli 
 George Sanders as Raymond Fountaine
 Giorgia Moll as Cora Barbarelli
 Micheline Presle as Monique Bouvier
 Emma Baron as Gregoria
 Mathilda Calnan as Mrs. Thompson 
 Fanfulla as The Florist
 Charles Fawcett as Martin

References

External links
 

1964 films
1960s thriller films
Films directed by George Marshall
Films scored by Angelo Francesco Lavagnino
Films set in Italy
American thriller films
Universal Pictures films
1960s English-language films
1960s American films